Triantaphillos Chatzinicolaou (Greek: Τριαντάφυλλος Χατζηνικολάου), known professionally as Triantaphillos (Greek: Τριαντάφυλλος) (born 20 June 1977), is a Greek singer.

Biography
Triantaphillos was born on 20 June 1977 in Rhodes. At his 19 he moved to Athens. His first album  Vlepo kati oneira (Βλέπω κάτι όνειρα) sold more than 48,000 copies in its first three months. His second album Grammata kai afieroseis (Γράμματα και αφιερώσεις) was certified platinum while his third, I agapi den pernaei (Η αγάπη δεν περνάει) became gold. Triantaphillos released a CD single in July 2009, with title "Epitelous oi dio mas" ("Επιτέλους οι δυο μας") and began a residency in Volos on 29 January 2010.

Personal life
Triantaphillos first met his wife Dimitra Siambani at a cafe and they had a small traditional wedding at Lutra Ipati on 23 August 2014. The singer became a father to a son Nicolas at the age of 39.

Discography

Albums

Compilations

Singles

Cover Editions

Duets

Music videos

Filmography

Television

References

Living people
1977 births
20th-century Greek male singers
21st-century Greek male singers
People from Rhodes
Survivor Greece contestants